Andrew Richard Bray (born 29 October 1981) is an English cricketer. Bray is a right-handed batsman who bowls right-arm fast-medium.

Bray represented the Kent Cricket Board in List A cricket. His debut List A match came against the Worcestershire Cricket Board in the 2000 NatWest Trophy. From 2000 to 2001, he represented the Board in 5 List A matches, the last of which came against the Leicestershire Cricket Board in the 2nd of the 2002 Cheltenham & Gloucester Trophy which was held in 2001. In his 5 List A matches, he scored 5 runs at a batting average of 2.50, with a high score of 5. With the ball he took 4 wickets at a bowling average of 37.50, with best figures of 2/18.

He plays club cricket for Folkestone Cricket Club in the Kent Cricket League.

References

External links

1979 births
Living people
People from Westminster
Cricketers from Greater London
English cricketers
Kent Cricket Board cricketers